The 2012 Easter Cup (French: Coupes de Pâques 2012) is a motor race that will be the first of ten rounds in the 2012 FIA GT1 World Championship season. It will take place at the Circuit Paul Armagnac in France on 8 April 2012. The race will be the first time the opening race of the GT1 World Championship season has not taken place at the Yas Marina Circuit in Abu Dhabi. Eighteen cars representing nine manufacturers will take part in the race, including six new manufacturers and seven new teams. The event will also be the first round of the 2012 FIA GT3 European Championship season.

AF Corse's Toni Vilander and Filip Salaquarda started the qualifying race from pole position. The qualifying race was won by Audi drivers Stéphane Ortelli and Laurens Vanthoor, with team-mates Frank Stippler and Oliver Jarvis in second place.

Qualifying

Qualifying result
Qualifying decides the grid order for the Qualifying Race, which in turn decides the grid order for the Championship Race. It is divided into three twenty-minute sessions. Each car has two drivers, designated "Driver 1" and "Driver 2". Driver 1 takes part in the first and third sessions, while Driver 2 takes part in the second session. At the end of the first session, the three slowest cars are eliminated, while the six slowest cars in the second session are also eliminated. The third and final session is contested between the remaining eight cars.

As the No. 11 Sunred Ford of Emmanuel Moncini and Andy Soucek was withdrawn from the event, three cars were eliminated from the first session instead of the normal four.

Notes:
 — The No. 24 Reiter Lamborghini had its Qualifying 3 times cancelled following a stewards decision.

Race results

Qualifying Race

Notes:
 — The No. 18 Vita4One BMW was given a 30 second post-race penalty for failing to turn off their engine during their pit stop.

Championship Race

References

Nogaro
Nogaro